Suzanne Spiteri (born 31 October 1978) is a Maltese sprinter. She competed in the women's 100 metres at the 2000 Summer Olympics.

References

External links
 

1978 births
Living people
Athletes (track and field) at the 2000 Summer Olympics
Maltese female sprinters
Olympic athletes of Malta
Athletes (track and field) at the 2001 Mediterranean Games
Place of birth missing (living people)
Mediterranean Games competitors for Malta
Olympic female sprinters